Coleophora armeniae is a moth of the family Coleophoridae that can be found in southern part of Russia, Ukraine, and in Asian countries such as Armenia, China, Kazakhstan, Kyrgyzstan and Turkey.

Adults are on wing in August.

References

External links

armeniae
Moths of Asia
Moths of Europe
Moths described in 1991